The High Sheriff of Louth was the Crown's representative for County Louth, a territory known as his bailiwick. Selected from three nominated people, he held his office for the duration of a year. He had judicial, ceremonial and administrative functions and executed High Court Writs.

History
The office of High Sheriff is the oldest under the British crown. It was established in Louth in 1227 and remained first in precedence in the county until the reign of Edward VII, when an Order in Council in 1908 gave the Lord-Lieutenant the prime office under the Crown as the Sovereign's personal representative. In the United Kingdom, the High Sheriff remains the Sovereign's county representative for all matters relating to the Judiciary and the maintenance of law and order. The office of High Sheriff of Louth was abolished in 1922 when the Irish Free State became largely independent.

High Sheriffs of County Louth
1234: Ralph de Pitchford
1270–1272: John de Pitchford
1274: John de Baskervill
1275: Roger de Crumba
1281–1284: Nicholas de Netterville
1285–1291: William de Spineto
1287: Nicholas de Netterville
1291: Thomas de Stanley
1293: Richard Taaffe
1297: William de Hatch
1310: William Dowdall
1311: Richard Gernon (murdered)
1315: Richard Taaffe
1329: Geoffrey de Brandwade
1331: John Gernon
1346: James Audley 
1375: John Dowdall 
1377: John Taaffe
1381: Peter Peppard
1385: Milo Haddesor
1386: George Telyng
1400: Thomas Talbot
1401: Walter Plunkett
1402: John Clynton of Keppock
1403: Sir John Bedilowe, Kt
1405: John Dowdall (killed)
1407: John  Cusack 
1408: John Cusack 
1410: Walter Plunkett (second term)
1424: Sir James White
1425: Sir John Bellew, Kt
1426: John Bellew
1427: John Bellew
1440: Sir Nicholas Taaffe
1496: Patrick Plunkett
1497: Richard Plunkett
1499: John  Gernon of Killencoole
1558: Edward Gernon of Gernonstown
1562: Sir John Bellew
1578: Roger Gernon or Garland
1593: Thomas Gernon
1594: Roger Gernon
1595: Rice Jones
1596: Rice Jones

17th century

18th century

19th century

20th century

References
 High Sheriffs 1361–1918

 
Louth
History of County Louth